Bhodaha is a small town in the Bara District in the Narayani Zone of south-eastern Nepal. It has a population of 6,491 people in 1,071 households as of the 1991 Nepal census.

References

External links
UN map of the municipalities of Bara District

Populated places in Bara District